Saturn Award for Best DVD or Blu-ray Collection (formerly Saturn Award for Best DVD Movie Collection) is an award given by the Academy of Science Fiction, Fantasy and Horror Films  to each movie collection. The movie collection can be either a series of movies simply, even a franchise, or movies that have the same director. The following is a list of the winners of this award:

External links
 Saturn Awards

Best DVD Collection